William Connor Wright Jr. (October 22, 1930 – June 4, 2016) was an American author, editor and playwright.  He is best known for his non fiction writing covering a wildly divergent list of subjects:  from the April in Paris Ball at the Waldorf-Astoria to genetics and behavior to true crime and grand opera.

The great Harvard naturalist and author, E. O. Wilson, said of Wright's Born that Way, Genes, Behavior, Personality:  "It takes an independent writer and free spirit to tell the story straight, and thank God Wright has done it."

In addition to Lillian Hellman, the Image and the Woman, Wright's books include The Von Bulow Affair, and two books with and about Luciano Pavarotti: Pavarotti, My Own Story and Pavarotti, My World.

Biography
Wright was born in Philadelphia, the son of  William Connor Wright Sr. and Josephine Hartshorne Wright. He graduated from the Germantown Friends School and earned his B.A. at Yale University. He lived for many years in New York City; and in later years, Key West, Florida. His longtime companion was the writer Barry Raine.

Career
After his Army service, Wright was an editor at Holiday magazine when it was located in Philadelphia and published the likes of John Steinbeck, V.S. Pritchett and Lawrence Durrell.  When Holiday became a casualty of the Curtis Publishing Company's disintegration, Wright accepted a bizarre offer from composer Gian Carlo Menotti to become manager of Menotti's Spoleto Festival, then held only in Italy.  Wright's job was to oversee the production of some ten events put on by the festival's U.S. side.  Each of his events was successful, but the overall festival was a financial disaster.  Unnerved, Wright resigned.

After struggling for five years writing magazine articles, Wright accepted an offer to become the editor of Chicago magazine, which he did from 1969 to 1971.  Although the magazine was well received by both Chicagoans and advertisers, his tenure was cut short when the magazine was closed down for making jibes at the elder Mayor Richard Daley.  Although offered editorial positions at three other publications, Wright turned to writing full-time and continued to do so until a few years before his death, mostly authoring non-fiction books.

Works

Books
Ball, 1972, Saturday Review Press
Heiress, the Rich Life of Marjorie Merriweather Post,  1978, New Republic Books
Rich Relations, a novel, 1980, G.P. Putnam's Sons
Pavarotti, My Own Story, 1981, Doubleday
The Von Bulow Affair, 1983, Delacorte Press
Lillian Hellman, the Image, the Woman, 1986, Simon and Schuster
All the Pain Money Can Buy: The Life of Christina Onassis, 1991, Simon and Schuster
Sins of the Father,  with Eileen Franklin. 1991, Crown Publishers
Pavarotti, My World, 1995, Crown Publishers
Born that Way, Genes, Behavior, Personality, 1998, Alfred A. Knopf
Harvard’s Secret Court: The Savage 1920 Purge of Campus Homosexuals, 2005, St. Martin's Press

Television 
Songs of Naples, a PBS special with Luciano Pavarotti

Plays 
The Julia Wars, Lillian Hellman's legal battle with Mary McCarthy
Dreams and Decay in the Winter Palace, the descent of Catherine the Great from idealistic liberalism to decadent conservatism

Notable reviews 
The Showgirl and Her (Many) Princes a review of Gold Digger by Constance Rosenblum, May 17, 2000 New York Times.
The Love-Hate Themes in Albee’s Life and Work a review of EDWARD ALBEE biography by Mel Gussow, August 23, 1999, New York Times.
Why Lillian Hellman Remains Fascinating stage view article in The New York Times November 3, 1996.

References

1930 births
2016 deaths
American biographers
20th-century American dramatists and playwrights
American magazine editors
United States Army personnel
Writers from Philadelphia
Yale University alumni
20th-century American non-fiction writers
Germantown Friends School alumni
Historians of LGBT topics
LGBT people from Pennsylvania
American gay writers